Kjetil Lund (born 1970) is a Norwegian civil servant and politician for the Labour Party.

He hails from Vigrestad. He studied at the University of Bergen from 1990, taking the cand.mag. degree in 1992. In 1996 he took the cand.polit. degree in economics. From 1997 he worked one year in Statistics Norway, before being hired in the Ministry of Finance. After advancing through the hierarchy, and spending the years 2003 to 2005 as an adviser in Tanzania, he was hired as a senior adviser in the Office of the Prime Minister at the inception of the Stoltenberg's Second Cabinet in 2005. In 2009 he changed job, to State Secretary in the Ministry of Finance. He remained such until Stoltenberg's Second Cabinet fell in October 2013. In 2014 he was an adviser to Stoltenberg, who was now a UN Special Envoy on Climate Change.

Kjetil Lund was subsequently an executive in Statkraft. In 2017 he was appointed to the city government of Oslo as City Commissioner of Business and Ownership, succeeding Geir Lippestad. In 2019 Lund became the new director of the Norwegian Water Resources and Energy Directorate.

References

1970 births
Living people
People from Hå
University of Bergen alumni
Norwegian civil servants
Norwegian expatriates in Tanzania
Labour Party (Norway) politicians
Norwegian state secretaries
Politicians from Oslo
Directors of government agencies of Norway